Maria Alexandra Paula Louise Jademyr Zazzi, known as Alexandra Zazzi (born 7 June 1966 in Rapallo, Italy) is a Swedish chef, journalist and television host.

Career
In 1998, Zazzi gained fame after winning reality show Expedition Robinson 1998 also known as Survivor in its second season becoming also the first female winner of the reality show.

After her victory, she became a television host for cooking shows like Köket on TV4 and Meny on Swedish Radio P1. She has also been a reporter for Spårlöst försvunnen on TV3 and also been a guest on many radio and television programs since 1998. Zazzi is also a journalist writing about food for several Swedish magazines. She is a columnist on the Göteborgs-Posten newspaper and also in Matmagasinet. She is the owner of a restaurant.

Bibliography
Sunt med Zazzi (2005). 
Torsdagarna med Zazzi: filosofi, känsla och kärlek till mat (2008). 
Zazzis pasta (2003). 
Zazzis mat: med smak av Italien (2005) 
Grytboken: fyrtiofem recept av kända och okända svenska matkonstnärer (1999).

Awards 
Winner of Expedition Robinson 1998
Winner of Riksmästerskapet i matlagning 2006

References

External links 
 
 
 

Swedish television hosts
Swedish journalists
Swedish women journalists
Winners in the Survivor franchise
1966 births
Survivor (franchise) winners
Swedish people of Italian descent
Living people
21st-century Swedish women writers
Swedish women television presenters